Mothers against decapentaplegic homolog 5 also known as SMAD5 is a protein that in humans is encoded by the SMAD5 gene.

SMAD5, as its name describes, is a homolog of the Drosophila gene: "Mothers against decapentaplegic", based on a tradition of such unusual naming within the gene research community. It belongs to the SMAD family of proteins, which belong to the  TGFβ superfamily of modulators. Like many other TGFβ family members SMAD5 is involved in cell signalling and modulates signals of bone morphogenetic proteins (BMP's). The binding of ligands causes the oligomerization and phosphorylation of the SMAD5 protein. SMAD5 is a receptor regulated SMAD (R-SMAD) and is activated by bone morphogenetic protein type 1 receptor kinase. It may play a role in the pathway where TGFβ is an inhibitor of hematopoietic progenitor cells.

References 

Developmental genes and proteins
MH1 domain
MH2 domain
R-SMAD
Transcription factors
Human proteins